Kerameus is a surname. Notable people with the surname include: 

Niki Kerameus (born 1980), Greek lawyer and politician
Theophanes Kerameus (1129–1152), bishop of Rossano

Greek-language surnames